The 2016–17 Utah Utes women's basketball team will represent the University of Utah during the 2016–17 NCAA Division I women's basketball season. The Utes, led by second year head coach Lynne Roberts, played their home games at the Jon M. Huntsman Center and were members of the Pac-12 Conference. They finished the season 16–15, 5–13 in Pac-12 play to finish in a 4 way tie for ninth place. They lost in the first round of the Pac-12 women's tournament to Arizona State. They were invited to the Women's National Invitation Tournament where they lost to UC Davis in the first round.

Roster

Schedule and results 

|-
!colspan=9 style="background:#CC0000; color:white;"| Exhibition

|-
!colspan=9 style="background:#CC0000; color:white;"| Non-conference regular season

|-
!colspan=9 style="background:#CC0000; color:white;"| Pac-12 regular season

|-
!colspan=9 style="background:#CC0000;"| Pac-12 Women's Tournament

|-
!colspan=9 style="background:#CC0000;"| Women's National Invitation Tournament

Rankings
2016–17 NCAA Division I women's basketball rankings

See also
2016–17 Utah Utes men's basketball team

References 

Utah Utes women's basketball seasons
Utah
2017 Women's National Invitation Tournament participants
Utah Utes
Utah Utes